13 Years (Best Of) is a greatest hits album released in 1993 by New Zealand reggae group, Herbs.

Track listing

References 

Herbs (band) compilation albums
1993 greatest hits albums